Lene Tranberg,  Hon. FAIA (born 29 November 1956) is a Danish architect, head architect and a founding partner of Lundgaard & Tranberg.

History
Lene Tranberg was born in Copenhagen in 1956. In 1977, she was admitted to the Royal Danish Academy of Fine Arts, School of Architecture where she studied under Erik Christian Sørensen. In 1983, one year before graduating, she co-founded Lundgaard & Tranberg with Boje Lundgaard. The firm gained prominence after the turn of the millennium with a number of high-profile buildings in Copenhagen, including most notably the Tietgenkollegiet student residences and the Royal Danish Playhouse. Both are generally considered to be among the most successful Danish buildings of the decade.

In parallel with her career as a practicing architect, Tranberg began teaching at the Academy in 1986 and was employed there as a lector from 1989 to 1998. She has also held numerous positions in the world of Danish architecture, including CEO of the Danish Architecture Centre from 1998 to 2002.

Awards and distinctions

Individual distinctions
 1994 Eckersberg Medal (with Boje Lundgaard)
 2002 Dreyer Honorary Award (with Boje Lundgaard)
 2005 Nykredit Architecture Prize
 2005 C. F. Hansen Medal
 2010 Danish Business Woman of the Year
 2008 Honor Prize, National Bank of Denmark Jubilee Fund 
 2010 Knight of the Order of the Dannebrog
 2010 Honorary Fellowship, American Institute of Architects
 2014 Prince Eugen Medal for architecture

Distinctions for projects
 2006 RIBA European Award for Kilen
 2007 RIBA European Award for Tietgenkollegiet
 2008 RIBA European Award for Royal Danish Playhouse
 2008 iF product design award for Royal Playhouse theatre chair
 2009 Red Dot Design Award for Royal Playhouse theatre chair

See also
Women in architecture
Tranberg, Lene. “Tietgen Dormitory / Lundgaard &amp; Tranberg Architects.” ArchDaily. ArchDaily, February 7, 2014. https://www.archdaily.com/474237/tietgen-dormitory-lundgaard-and-tranberg-architects. 
Tranberg, Lene, and Justine Harvey. 2016. “Give Something Away for Free: In Denmark, Lundgaard & Tranberg Arkitekter Is Continuing the Country’s Tradition for Design That Works to Knit Society Together as the Starting Point for Its Architecture.” Architecture New Zealand Dec. (November): 28–32. https://search-ebscohost-com.spot.lib.auburn.edu/login.aspx?direct=true&db=bvh&AN=759537&site=ehost-live.

References

1956 births
Living people
20th-century Danish women artists
21st-century Danish women artists
Architects from Copenhagen
Danish women company founders
20th-century Danish architects
21st-century Danish architects
Royal Danish Academy of Fine Arts alumni
Honorary Fellows of the American Institute of Architects
Recipients of the Eckersberg Medal
Recipients of the C.F. Hansen Medal
Recipients of the Prince Eugen Medal
Danish women architects